Club Paradise is a 1986 American comedy film directed by Harold Ramis and starring Robin Williams, Twiggy, Peter O'Toole, and Jimmy Cliff. Set in a fictional Caribbean banana republic, it follows a group of vacationers' attempts to create a luxury resort out of a seedy nightclub, and the series of increasingly unlikely events that take place.

The film reunites director / co-writer Ramis with most of his SCTV co-stars – SCTV cast members Andrea Martin, Eugene Levy, Rick Moranis, Joe Flaherty, and Robin Duke play supporting roles in the film, as does co-writer Brian Doyle-Murray, a former SCTV staff writer. It was the final film of actor Adolph Caesar, who died in March 1986, four months before the film's release.

Plot
Jack Moniker is a Chicago firefighter who is injured on the job. Using his disability insurance payout, he retires to the small Caribbean island of Saint Nicholas, and buys a small property. Anthony Croyden Hayes, appointed by the British crown as governor of St. Nicholas, is more concerned with vacationing than governing. Miss Phillipa Lloyd, who is visiting St. Nicholas with some friends, decides to stay permanently and becomes Jack's girlfriend.

Jack befriends financially troubled reggae musician Ernest Reed and they form Club Paradise, which they market as a Club Med-style resort complete with a brochure that features photographs of Jack in various disguises on every page. This attracts a handful of tourists, including Barry and Barry who are there for the marijuana and the women. Much of the film involves the tourists' comic misadventures adjusting to island life and the low-rent facilities of Club Paradise. Also traveling to the island is The New York Times travel writer Terry Hamlin who ends up spending most of her time in the company of Governor Hayes. Adding to the fun is suburban housewife Linda White, who is vacationing with her husband Randy, who despite the very favorable surroundings and atmosphere, is not very randy.

Voit Zerbe plays a key role, as a developer who wants to run Jack and Ernest off their property so he can build a massive high-end casino on the beach as part of a deal he's making with two business partners. To do that, he uses the help of the local prime minister Solomon Gundy and the prime minister's men to cause trouble and get Club Paradise to close "legally." Jack and Ernest go so far as to sneak aboard Zerbe's yacht to provide some "useful intelligence" for Governor Hayes by finding out what is going to happen to the future of Saint Nicholas. They skin dive to the yacht where they are captured by local police and thrown in jail. When Prime Minister Gundy's strong arm tactics don't work, he orders a military takeover of the island. Ernest builds up a resistance force, and St. Nicholas is soon threatened with the possibility of civil war, which is averted at the last minute with assistance from Jack and Governor Hayes. As Gundy's takeover fails, Zerbe and his partners leave Saint Nicholas and head for the Cayman Islands.

Cast

Harold Ramis' wife Anne Ramis also cameos as a travel agent.

Production
Shooting took place in Jamaica, Chicago, and Los Angeles from April to July 1985. The titular "Club Paradise" was a set constructed on Winifred Beach in Portland Parish, while other scenes were shot in the city of Port Antonio. Production company Warner Bros. planned to release it in early 1986, but held it back until July.

Bill Murray turned down the film's lead role, which was eventually given to Robin Williams; his brother, Brian Doyle-Murray, ended up in the cast instead. John Cleese was also slated to star, but immediately dropped out before Peter O'Toole signed on to replace him.

"Ed Roboto" is a pseudonym for Harry Shearer, who was asked to do a rewrite with Tom Leopold. Only two words of what they wrote ended up in the film (the title). Shearer later commented that he was "so appalled by the movie" that he removed his name from the credits.

Adolph Caesar died of a heart attack four months before the film's release.

Soundtrack
The film's soundtrack was released by Columbia Records and includes several tracks by Jimmy Cliff, Elvis Costello, Mighty Sparrow, Blue Riddim Band and Well Pleased & Satisfied, some of which are unique to this release. It was not released on compact disc until 1994 in Japan, and then in 2004 in Europe, with the latter including seven extra songs.

Reception
The film was given mostly negative reviews from critics with Rotten Tomatoes maintaining Club Paradise an 11% rating based on 28 reviews. Audiences polled by CinemaScore gave the film an average grade of "C+" on an A+ to F scale.

Variety said: "There are enough funny skits in Club Paradise to make for a good hour of SCTV, where most of the cast is from, but too few to keep this Club Med satire afloat for 104 minutes." People wrote: "Director Harold Ramis, who co-wrote the film with Brian Doyle-Murray, never stoops for an easy laugh. He seems capable, however, of making a movie with more momentum than this."
Roger Ebert gave the film 2 out of 4 stars and wrote: "The movie never really comes together, and I think the fault for that begins with Williams. When the star of a movie seems desperate enough to depend on one-liners, can the rest of the cast be blamed for losing confidence in the script?"
Dave Kehr of the Chicago Reader wrote: "Moranis and Levy get most of the laughs as a pair of geeky business partners desperately on the make for beach bunnies; Williams is saddled with a lot of soggy insult humor that doesn't really let him show his gifts."

Ramis later said "We thought Club Paradise had a good chance" at the box office. "But we were the fourth Caribbean comedy out that year [1986], and none of them did any business. The casting ended up being diametrically opposed to what was intended. It was intended for Bill Murray and John Cleese, with Bill as the laid-back guy and Cleese as the over-the-top guy, and we ended up with Robin Williams and Peter O'Toole, with O'Toole as the laid-back guy and Robin the over-the-top guy. The polarities shifted, and it was probably not as interesting or as solid as it might have been if Bill and Cleese were there."

 
Peter O'Toole's performance in the film earned him a Razzie Award nomination for Worst Supporting Actor, but lost to Jerome Benton for Under the Cherry Moon.

See also
 List of American films of 1986

References

External links

 
 
 
 

1986 films
1986 comedy films
American comedy films
Films directed by Harold Ramis
Films scored by David Mansfield
Films scored by Van Dyke Parks
Films set in Chicago
Films shot in Chicago
Films shot in Jamaica
Warner Bros. films
Films with screenplays by Harold Ramis
Films with screenplays by Brian Doyle-Murray
Films about vacationing
Films set in the Caribbean
1980s English-language films
1980s American films